10th Street Station is a light rail stop along the Metro Green Line in downtown Saint Paul, Minnesota. It is located along Cedar Street between 11th Street and 10th Street. This is just south of Interstate 94.

Construction in this area began in June 2011.  The station opened along with the rest of the line in 2014.

References

External links
Metro Transit: 10th Street Station

Metro Green Line (Minnesota) stations in Saint Paul, Minnesota
Railway stations in the United States opened in 2014
2014 establishments in Minnesota